Al-Hikmah University is an Islamic university located in Ilorin, Kwara State, Nigeria. It was founded in 2005 by AbdulRaheem Oladimeji Islamic Foundation (AROIF) based in Nigeria and World Assembly of Muslim Youths (WAMY) based in Jeddah. Professor Muhammed Taofeek Olalekan Ibrahim is the immediate past Vice-chancellor. He was succeeded by Professor Noah Yusuf. who is now the current Vice-chancellor. The goal of Al-Hikmah University is to be a center of intellectual and moral excellence.

The University came into existence via the granting of an operating license to run as a Conventional Private University by the Federal Government of Nigeria License No. 010 on 7 January 2005. It commenced academic activities during the 2005–2006 academic session with 70 students spread across the three take-off colleges: Humanities, Management Sciences and Natural Sciences.

Vice chancellors 
Professor Musbau Adewumi Akanji
Professor Abdullahi Ahmad
Prof. Sulyman Age Abdulkareem
Professor Muhammed Taofeek Olalekan Ibrahim.
Professor Noah Yusuf 
Professor Razaq Deremi Abubakre

Faculties and Programmes 
The university has several Faculties which are spread across two campuses (Ilorin and Igbaja) in Kwara State.

 FACULTY OF EDUCATION

(i) B. Agriculture

 FACULTY OF HEALTH SCIENCES

(i) B.Sc. Public Health

(ii) B. Nursing Science

(iii) B.Sc. Physiology

(iv) B. Medical Laboratory Science (BMLS)

(V) B.Sc. Human Anatomy

 FACULTY OF LAW

(i) LL.B. Common Law

(ii) LL.B. Common and Islamic Law

 FACULT OF NATURAL AND APPLIED SCIENCES

(i) B.Sc. Computer Science

(vii) B.Sc. Biology

(ii) B.Sc. Software Engineering

(ix) B.Sc. Biochemistry

(iii) B.Sc. Cyber Security

(x) B.Sc. Microbiology

(iv) B.Sc. Information System           (xi) B.Sc. Mathematics

(v) B.Sc. Geology                             (xii) B.Sc. Industrial Mathematics

(vi) B.Sc. Petroleum Chemistry        (xiii) B.Sc. Physics with Electronics

(vii) B.Sc. Industrial Chemistry         (xiv) B.Sc. Physics

(xv) B.Sc. Statistics

 FACULTY OF HUMANITIES AND SOCIAL SCIENCES

(i) B.Sc. Sociology                            (vii) B.Sc. Islamic Studies

(ii) B.Sc. Public Administration          (ix) B.Sc. History and International Relation

(iii) B.Sc. Mass Communication         (x) B.Sc. Arabic

(iv) B.Sc. Political Science & Conflict Resolution            (xi) B.Sc. English

 FACULTY OF MANAGEMENT SCIENCES

(i) B.Sc. Accounting

(ii) B.Sc. Economics

(iii) B.Sc. Business Administration

(iv) B.Sc. Marketing

(v) B.Sc. Banking & Finance

 FACULTY OF EDUCATION

(i) B.Sc. (Ed.) Computer Science                (ix) B. Library and Information Science (BLIS)

(ii) B.Sc. (Ed.) Chemistry                             (x) B.A. (Ed.) Islamic Studies

(iii) B.Sc. (Ed.) Mathematics                       (xi) B.A. (Ed.) Arabic

(iv) B.Sc. (Ed.) Biology                                (iv) B.A. (Ed.) Social Studies

(v) B.Sc. (Ed.) Physics                                 (v) B.A. (Ed.) English

(vi) B.Sc. (Ed.) Education Technology          (vi) B.Sc. (Ed.) Political Science

(vii) B.Sc. (Ed.) Guidance and Counseling   (vii) B.Sc. (Ed.) Business Education

(viii) B.Sc. (Ed.) Educational Management   (viii) B.Sc. (Ed.) Economics

Sub-Degree Diploma Programmes 
(i) Diploma in Common Law                            (v) Diploma in Accounting

(ii) Diploma in Common and Islamic Law       (vi) Diploma in Business Administration

(iii) Diploma in Arabic and Islamic Studies     (vii) Diploma in Computer Science

(iv) Diploma in International Relations

Collaborations
Al-Hikmah University has collaborated with National Drug Law Enforcement Agency (NDLEA) to counter act drug abuse especially amongst youth.
Also with the Economic and Financial crime commission Agency.

References

External links

Education in Kwara State
2005 establishments in Nigeria
Islamic universities and colleges in Nigeria
Ilorin
Academic libraries in Nigeria